Dettingen may refer to:

Municipalities 
 Dettingen an der Erms in the district of Reutlingen in Baden-Württemberg
 Dettingen an der Iller in the district of Biberach in Baden-Württemberg
 Dettingen unter Teck in the district of Esslingen in Baden-Württemberg

Parts of cities and municipalities 
 Dettingen (Horb) is part of the city of Horb am Neckar in the district of Freudenstadt in Baden-Württemberg
 Dettingen (Rottenburg) is a part of the City of Rottenburg am Neckar in the district of Tübingen in Baden-Württemberg
 Dettingen (Ehingen) is part of Ehingen in the Alb-Donau in Baden-Württemberg
 Dettingen (Konstanz), is part of Konstanz in Baden-Württemberg
 Dettingen am Albuch is part of the municipality Gerstetten (Heidenheim district in Baden-Württemberg)
 Dettingen am Main is part of the municipality Karlstein am Main (Aschaffenburg district in Bavaria)

Other
Battle of Dettingen, which took place in what is now Karlstein am Main, which led to the naming of:
Dettingen Te Deum, a canticle composed by George Frideric Handel
Dettingen Company, a training company at the Royal Military Academy Sandhurst
Dettingen Park, a housing development in Deepcut, Surrey, UK, built on the former Alma Dettingen Barracks Princess Royal Barracks